Madern Gerthener (1360/1370 – 1430) was a German stonemason and late Gothic architect.

Biography
Gerthener was born in Frankfurt to Johann Gerthener, a stonemason whose business the younger Gerthener took over by 1391. In 1395 he entered the city payroll, and soon took a leading role in the city's large construction works. One of his earlier works was involvement in building the Alte Brücke (Old Bridge) over the Main in 1399, and, although his role in only a few other works is directly attested, he was probably involved in a number of other projects around Frankfurt as its Werkmeister, including the city walls and town hall.

Of high architecture, the largest portion of his career in Frankfurt was spent on the Frankfurt Cathedral, whose works he was appointed to oversee in 1408. Of note here are the Cathedral's single tower, which Gerthener designed and began building in 1415, and which would become a symbol of Frankfurt's independence; and innovative use of hanging and vaulted tracery forms on the cathedral's portals that would become a characteristic of his style. He may have also been responsible for the tympanum above the south portal of the Liebfrauenkirche in Frankfurt, depicting a scene of the Adoration of the Magi.

By the 1410s his services were in enough demand that he worked on a number of projects outside Frankfurt as well, though most are only attributed to Gerthener based on style. The most important and confidently attributed of these are the portal to the Memorial Chapel of the Mainz Cathedral, dated to around 1425, which also includes several sculptures attributed to him, partly on the basis of payment records indicating he had at least occasionally worked as a sculptor.

References

 

14th-century births
1430 deaths
German architects
German sculptors
German male sculptors
Gothic architects
Gothic sculptors
Architects from Frankfurt